Jesse Selengut (born September 9, 1968) is an American trumpeter, composer, and singer. Selengut led the contemporary jazz group NOIR.

He earned a master's degree in jazz studies from New York University.

References 

American jazz trumpeters
American male trumpeters
Musicians from New York City
1968 births
Living people
Jazz musicians from New York (state)
21st-century trumpeters
21st-century American male musicians
American male jazz musicians

New York University alumni
People from Dover, New Jersey